Epicasta turbida is a species of beetle in the family Cerambycidae. It was described by Pascoe in 1866. It is known from Malaysia.

References

Desmiphorini
Beetles described in 1866